Peter Wuyts (born 24 February 1973) is a Belgian former racing cyclist. He rode in the 1999 Tour de France.

Major results

1994
 4th Grote Prijs Jef Scherens
1997
 1st Overall Tour de la province de Namur
1st Stage 2
 7th Grote Prijs Jef Scherens
1998
 1st Stage 4 Ronde van Nederland
 6th Overall Tour de l'Avenir
1st  Points classification
1st Stage 2
 9th Overall Circuito Montañes
 10th Overall Tour de la Region Wallonne
2002
 8th Hel van het Mergelland
2004
 2nd Schaal Sels
 8th Grote Prijs Jef Scherens
 10th Veenendaal–Veenendaal
2005
 1st De Drie Zustersteden

References

External links
 

1973 births
Living people
Belgian male cyclists
Sportspeople from Turnhout
Cyclists from Antwerp Province